Mantehwa Lahmsombat (born August 16, 1981), simply known as Man. He is a retired professional footballer from Khon Kaen, Thailand.

He also played for Bangkok University FC in the 2007 AFC Champions League group stage.

Clubs 

Senior

Honor
Ubon UMT United

Regional League Division 2:
Winners : 2015
Regional League North-East Division
 Runner-up : 2015

References

Living people
Mantehwa Lahmsombat
1981 births
Mantehwa Lahmsombat
Association football goalkeepers
Mantehwa Lahmsombat